"Déjà vu all over again" is a phrase taken from a famous quotation attributed to Yogi Berra: "It's like déjà vu all over again."

Deja Vu All Over Again may refer to:

 Deja Vu All Over Again (album), an album by John Fogerty
 Deja Vu All Over Again/The Best of T. Graham Brown, an album by T. Graham Brown
 "Déjà Vu All Over Again", an episode of Charmed
 "Déjà Vu All Over Again", an episode of Elementary
 "Déjà Vu All Over Again", an episode of La Femme Nikita
 "Déjà Vu All Over Again", an episode of Seven Days
 "Déjà Vu All Over Again", an episode of Shark
 "Déjà Vu All Over Again", an episode of Xena: Warrior Princess
 "Déjà Vu All Over Again", an episode  of Farscape: Season1 episode 19
 "It's Like Déjà Vu All Over Again" , an episode of Pretty Little Liars
 ""It's Like Déjà Vu All Over Again" , an episode of NCIS
"Déja Vu All Over Again", an episode of Medium Season 6 episode1
 "It's Like Déjà Vu All Over Again" , episode 96 of Naruto "Deadlock! Sannin Showdown!"